Jordan Schroder (born 5 December 1992) is an Australian rules footballer who played for  in the Australian Football League (AFL).

Drafted from the Calder Cannons in the TAC Cup with the 54th selection in the 2010 AFL Draft, Schroder made his debut for Geelong in the AFL in their Round 10 match against .

In 2013 he was one of three players who tied the J.J. Liston Trophy. He tied with Steve Clifton (North Ballarat) and Mitch Hallahan (Box Hill Hawks) all on 17 votes.

Schroder was delisted by Geelong at the conclusion of the 2014 AFL season. He moved to Essendon VFL in 2015, and will have the opportunity to play for the Essendon seniors during the 2015 pre-season competition due to provisional suspensions being served by senior Essendon players during the club's supplements controversy.

References

External links

Geelong Football Club players
J. J. Liston Trophy winners
Living people
1992 births
Australian people of Scottish descent
Australian rules footballers from Victoria (Australia)
Calder Cannons players